Verbascum bugulifolium is a species of Verbascum native to Bulgaria and western Turkey.

Description
The round or slightly angled stem also bears a few much smaller leaves. The inflorescence is a simple raceme, with each flower attached to the main stem by a short pedicel.

References

External links

bugulifolium
Flora of Bulgaria
Flora of Turkey
Plants described in 1797